The Khathiar–Gir dry deciduous forests (also Kathiarbar-Gir or Kathiawar-Gir) is a mostly arid ecoregion in northwestern India that stretches over  across Gujarat, Rajasthan and Madhya Pradesh. The dry deciduous forests in the region are dominated by teak, and thorny trees and scrub in drier areas.

Landscape

In the west is the Kathiawar Peninsula and the strip of western Rajasthan between the Aravalli Range and Thar Desert. To the northwest, the Kathiawar-Gir dry deciduous forests transit to the Upper Gangetic Plains moist deciduous forests. To the southeast lies the Narmada Valley dry deciduous forests, of the Vindhya Range, and the Narmada River Valley. The ecoregion also borders the North Western Ghats moist deciduous forests in southeastern Gujarat.

The ecoregion has a tropical monsoon climate, with most of its 550 to 700 mm average annual rainfall during the June–September southwest monsoon and little for the remaining months of the year, while temperatures often exceed 40 °C.  Higher elevations of the Aravallis stay cooler, and the windward slopes (generally southeast-facing) receive higher rainfall. This results in a dry landscape of thorny scrub, bare trees and rocks.

Flora

The composition of the ecoregion's forests varies with moisture and soil. They have a three-storied structure, with the top story reaching . Arid areas are dominated by Anogeissus pendula growing in association with khair, especially on the quartzite ridges and gneiss hillocks of the Aravalli Range. Less arid areas are dominated by teak (Tectona grandis), bael (Aegle marmelos), Boswellia serrata, Desmodium oojeinense, Diospyros species, silk-cotton tree, Sterculia urens, Phyllanthus emblica, Dalbergia paniculata, and Terminalia elliptica. Mount Abu is covered in dry deciduous forest with conifers at the highest elevations. Thorn scrub forests, characterized by Euphorbia caducifolia, Maytenus emarginata, Acacia senegal, Commiphora mukul, Wrightia tinctoria, Flueggea leucopyrus, Grewia species, occur on rocky Aravalli hillsides and in degraded areas. The endemic species Dicliptera abuensis, Strobilanthes halbergii, and Veronica anagallis also grow in these areas. Date palms (Phoenix sylvestris) and fig trees (Ficus racemosa) grow near rivers and streams of the hills.

Fauna
Bird species include the:
endangered great Indian bustard (Ardeotis nigriceps)
lesser florican (Eupodotis indica)
near-endemic white-naped tit (Parus nuchalis), which inhabits the thorny scrub areas of the ecoregion.

The protected areas of this region are also home to 80 mammal species including
 Indian leopard (Panthera pardus fusca), Indian wolf (Canis lupus pallipes), striped hyena (Hyaena hyaena), four-horned antelope (Tetracerus quadricornis), blackbuck (Antilope cervicapra), and chinkara (Gazella bennettii)
jungle cat (Felis chaus), Asiatic wildcat (Felis silvestris ornata) and rusty-spotted cat (Prionailurus rubiginosus).
golden jackal (Canis aureus)
Bengal tiger (Panthera tigris tigris) in the eastern part of this ecoregion
Asiatic lion (Panthera leo leo) in Gir National Park and surrounding areas in Kathiawar Peninsula
Sloth bear (Melursus ursinus) in Ratan Mahal Wildlife Sanctuary

Threats to biodiversity
The human population in the region is growing, and wildlife habitats have mostly been removed or degraded due to collection of firewood and timber, and use as grazing land for livestock.

Protected areas
Protected areas cover  in this ecoregion, and include:
Balaram Ambaji Wildlife Sanctuary
Darrah National Park (including Jawahar Sagar Wildlife Sanctuary and National Chambal Sanctuary)
Gandhi Sagar Sanctuary
Ghatigaon Wildlife Sanctuary
Gir Forest National Park
Jaisamand Wildlife Sanctuary
Jambughoda Wildlife Sanctuary
Kumbhalgarh Wildlife Sanctuary
Kuno National Park
Madhav National Park
Mount Abu Wildlife Sanctuary
Nahargarh Biological Park
Ramgarh Wildlife Sanctuary
Ranthambore National Park
Ratan Mahal Wildlife Sanctuary
Sailana Kharmour Bird Sanctuary
Sariska Tiger Reserve
Sita Mata Wildlife Sanctuary

See also
 Ecoregions of India

References

External link

 

 
Ecoregions of India
Environment of Gujarat
Environment of Madhya Pradesh
Environment of Rajasthan
Forests of India
Geography of Gujarat
Geography of Madhya Pradesh
Geography of Rajasthan
Indomalayan ecoregions
Tropical and subtropical dry broadleaf forests